Mano Ya Na Mano may refer to:
 Mano Ya Na Mano (1995 TV series), an Indian horror television drama-series
 Mano Ya Na Mano (2006 TV series), an Indian reality television program